The Vorontsov Palace may refer to:

 Vorontsov Palace (Alupka) in Alupka, Crimea, Ukraine
 Vorontsov Palace (Odesa) in Odesa, Ukraine
 Vorontsov Palace (Saint Petersburg) in Saint Petersburg, Russia

See also
 Vorontsov
 Vorontsov (disambiguation)